Ball's Pyramid is an erosional remnant of a shield volcano and caldera lying  southeast of Lord Howe Island in the Pacific Ocean.

Steep, eroded, and formed 6.4 million years ago, Ball's Pyramid is positioned in the centre of a submarine shelf and is surrounded by rough seas, making any approach difficult.

History

Discovery

The pyramid is named after Royal Navy Lieutenant Henry Lidgbird Ball, who reported discovering it in 1788. On the same voyage, Ball also reported discovering Lord Howe Island.

In The Voyage of Governor Phillip to Botany Bay with an Account of the Establishment of the Colonies of Port Jackson and Norfolk  Island (1789), Arthur Phillip gives this description of the area around Ball's Pyramid before describing Lord Howe Island:

There lies about four miles from the south-west part of the pyramid, a dangerous rock, which shows itself a little above the surface of the water, and appears not to be larger than a boat. Lieutenant Ball had no opportunity of examining whether there is a safe passage between them or not.

Survey and exploration

The first recorded person to go ashore is believed to have been Henry Wilkinson, a geologist at the New South Wales Department of Mines, in 1882.

In 1964, a team from Sydney attempted to climb to the summit of the pyramid. However, the climbers were forced to turn back on the fifth day as they ran short of food and water. The expedition was the idea of Australian adventurer Dick Smith, who was a member of Rover Scouts at the time. The expedition also involved other members of the Scouting movement and other people. Smith went on the expedition, but did not attempt the climb due to an unexpected medical operation two weeks before the expedition.

Ball's Pyramid was first climbed on 14 February 1965 by Bryden Allen, John Davis, Jack Pettigrew and David Witham of the Sydney Rock Climbing Club. Jack Hill of New Zealand then climbed to the summit with Pettigrew on the following day. Don Willcox and Ben Sandilands were part of the support team.

In 1979, Smith returned to the pyramid, together with climbers John Worrall and Hugh Ward. They successfully reached the summit and unfurled a flag of New South Wales provided to them by Premier Neville Wran.

Climbing was banned in 1982 under amendments to the Lord Howe Island Act, and in 1986, all access to the island was banned by the Lord Howe Island Board. In 1990, the policy was relaxed to allow some climbing under strict conditions, which in recent years has required an application to the relevant state minister.

Geography

Like Lord Howe Island and the Lord Howe Seamount Chain, Ball's Pyramid is based on the Lord Howe Rise, part of the submerged continent of Zealandia. Ball's Pyramid has a few satellite islets.

It is separated by a  submarine canyon from another shelf on which Lord Howe Island is located. The cliffs of the stack continue under the water surface to the level of the shelf.

Flora and fauna

Melaleuca howeana
A Melaleuca howeana shrub was found growing on Ball's Pyramid. The bush was growing in a small crevice where water was seeping through cracks in the underlying rocks. This moisture supported relatively lush plant growth which had, over time, resulted in a buildup of plant debris several metres deep.

Dryococelus australis
Ball's Pyramid supports the last known wild population of Lord Howe Island stick insect (Dryococelus australis).

Following the last sighting of the Lord Howe Island stick insect on Lord Howe Island in 1920, the species was presumed extinct. Evidence of continued survival on Ball's Pyramid was discovered during the 1964 climb when a dead specimen was found and photographed. Throughout the following years, several more dead specimens were discovered, but attempts to find live specimens were unsuccessful.

In 2001, a team of entomologists and conservationists landed on Ball's Pyramid to chart its flora and fauna. The population was extremely small, with only 24 individuals. Two pairs were brought to mainland Australia, and new populations have been successfully bred with the ultimate goal of reintroduction to Lord Howe Island.

See also

 List of volcanoes in Australia
 Lot's Wife (crag)
 Rockall
 Stac Lee
 Stac an Armin

References

Further reading
 
 "Rock of Ages", transcript of Australian Broadcasting Corporation Australian Story TV episode, 11 April 2005.

External links

 
 
 
 
 

Hotspot volcanoes
Miocene shield volcanoes
Shield volcanoes of Australia
Stacks of Australia
Uninhabited islands of Australia
Tourist attractions in New South Wales
Volcanic plugs of Australia
Volcanoes of the Pacific Ocean
Volcanoes of Zealandia
World Heritage Sites in Australia
Polygenetic shield volcanoes
Islands of New South Wales